Guzhen may refer to:

Guzhen County (固镇县), Bengbu, Anhui
Guzhen Town (固镇镇), Yu'an District, Lu'an, Anhui
Guzhen Town (古镇镇), Zhongshan, Guangdong